Land Park is a neighborhood in the city of Sacramento. Land Park consists of mainly single-family dwellings in the area between Interstate 5 to the west, Broadway to the north, Sutterville Road to the south and Freeport Blvd to the east. William Land Park is its namesake, a major city park south of Highway 50 and east of Interstate 5 in South Sacramento. It also contains the Sacramento Zoo along with the popular children's theme parks Funderland and Fairy Tale Town. In addition, Land Park is the home to the popular Vic's Ice Cream, Masullo Pizza, Tower Cafe, and Tower Theater. Katie Valenzuela is the city councilmember for District 4, which includes the entire Land Park area.

South Land Park
South Land Park is just south of Land Park and is bordered to the north by Sutterville Road, to the east by Freeport Blvd, to the west by Interstate 5 and to the south by Florin Road.  It has a lot of modern houses, many of them built in the South Land Park Hills. Two of the elementary schools in South Land Park are Pony Express and Alice Birney. South Land Park is close to the Greenhaven-Pocket area.

South Land Park Hills
South Land Park Hills is a subsection of the neighborhood on the southern end of South Land Park. This is the area bound by Fruitridge Road on the north, Florin Road on the south, Freeport Boulevard/State Route 160 on the east, and Interstate 5 on the west. Parks in South Land Park Hills include Reichmuth Park, Cooledge Park, and Argonaut Park. This mostly residential section holds a combination of apartments and single-family houses, many of which were built in the mid-Twentieth Century, including many Eichler homes.

Little Pocket
Little Pocket is a less well known section of the South Land Park community. Contained by Riverside Blvd, it lies between Sutterville and 35th Ave. This small neighborhood borders along the Sacramento River and Interstate 5. "Little Pocket" is host to a small park, Bahnfleth Park—named after esteemed politician Emil A. Bahnfleth. This park is most popularly used for recreational soccer matches by local youth leagues. Additionally, the neighborhood has a Westin hotel with a Scott's Seafood restaurant and has a small, family owned chocolate store named Kobasic's Candies.

Famous Residents of the Land Park area
 Phil Angelides - former California State Treasurer and 2006 gubernatorial nominee
 Rex Babin - Political Cartoonist
 Charles Calderon - California State Legislator lives here while the legislature is in session.
 Deftones - Alternative Metal band.
 Morton Downey Jr. - conservative radio commentator lived here when he was doing his TV show in the 80's in Sacramento
 Robert Fong - Sacramento City Councilmember, 4th district
 H. W. Harkness - a Gold Rush era physician and mycologist who owned most of the north-east corner of what is now the Land Park neighborhood
 Michael Rehm - Personal Injury Attorney, born, raised and currently lives in Land Park area.
 Anthony Kennedy - U.S. Supreme Court Justice was raised in the neighborhood and lived here until his appointment to the court.
 Sheila Kuehl - Former California State Legislator from Santa Monica lived in Land Park while serving in the legislature.
 Doris Matsui - Congresswoman, succeeded her husband upon his death, worked in the Clinton White House
 Ronald Alvaraz - Tavern, restaurant owner (The Distillery) in downtown Sacramento for more than 50 years.
 Robert Matsui - Congressman 1979–2005, DCCC Chairman, Sacramento City Councilmember
 John Mockler - former Interim Secretary of Education in California and former executive director of the California State Board of Education
 Stephen Pearcy (activist) - Sacramento attorney 
 Anne Rudin - former Sacramento Mayor
 Wayne Thiebaud - Artist, internationally known and critically influential on several generations of artist. 
 William Vollmann - Essayist
 Jimmie Yee - Sacramento County Supervisor and former Sacramento Mayor
 Wilson Riles - former California State Superintendent of Public Instruction

Neighborhoods in Sacramento, California